Rizhsky (masculine), Rizhskaya (feminine), or Rizhskoye (neuter) may refer to:
Rizhsky railway station, a rail terminal in Moscow, Russia
Rizhskaya (Kaluzhsko-Rizhskaya line), a station of the Moscow Metro, Line 6
Rizhskaya (Bolshaya Koltsevaya line), a prospective station of the Moscow Metro, Line 11

See also
 Riga (disambiguation)